Fellowship of the Royal Colleges of Surgeons (FRCS) is a professional qualification to practise as a senior surgeon in Ireland or the United Kingdom.  It is bestowed on an intercollegiate basis by the four Royal Colleges of Surgeons (the Royal College of Surgeons of England, Royal College of Surgeons in Ireland (chartered 1784), Royal College of Surgeons of Edinburgh (chartered 1505), and Royal College of Physicians and Surgeons of Glasgow). The initials may be used as post-nominal letters.

Several Commonwealth countries have organisations that bestow similar qualifications, among them the FRCSC in Canada, FRACS in Australia and New Zealand, FCS(SA) in South Africa, FCSHK in Hong Kong, FCPS by College of Physicians and Surgeons Pakistan in Pakistan and FCPS by College of Physicians & Surgeons of Mumbai in India.

The intercollegiate FRCS examinations are administered by two committees, the JCIE (Joint Committee on Intercollegiate Examinations, which handles domestic examinations) and the JSCFE (Joint Surgical Colleges Fellowship Examination, which handles overseas examinations). This system replaced the earlier one in which each college administered its own examinations. First the curricula were intercollegiately coordinated by the ISCP (Intercollegiate Surgical Curriculum Programme) of the JCST (Joint Committee on Surgical Training), and then the examinations became intercollegiate.

The original fellowship was available in general surgery and in certain specialties—ophthalmic or ENT surgery, or obstetrics and gynaecology—which were not indicated in the initials. It came to be taken midway through training. Each of the four Royal Colleges of Surgeons of the UK and Ireland used to administer its own examinations. The four postnominals were FRCS(Eng), FRCS(Ed), FRCS(G), and FRCS(I). The FRCS designation without further specification then referred by convention/tradition to FRCS(Eng) specifically. Today the examination and qualification are intercollegiate, although each surgeon can still choose afterward to be affiliated with one or more specific colleges. (In Canada the FRCS(C) qualification is administered by the Royal College of Physicians and Surgeons of Canada.)

There are now a range of higher fellowships, taken at the end of higher specialist training and often in narrower fields, the first of which was FRCS (Orth) in orthopaedics. Others include FRCS (Urol) in urology and FRCS (OMFS) in maxillofacial surgery.

Membership of the Royal Colleges of Surgeons

The MRCS examinations are also now intercollegiate.

Mr/Ms or Doctor?
Holders of FRCS (and the new, but not old, Membership – MRCS) often choose for traditional reasons to relinquish their title of "Doctor", reverting to "Mr", "Ms", "Mrs" or "Miss".

Until relatively recently - the early 19th century -  the training as a surgeon was through an apprenticeship, at the  end of which, if they had learnt their trade in a large city, they were examined and given a diploma; while physicians from the Middle Ages had to hold a university degree in medicine before they could practise.

Today, for most, the route to Fellowship is lengthy: one must qualify as a Doctor of medicine, then undergo further postgraduate study and training through junior doctor posts before then passing assessments to obtain surgical qualifications. There are some exceptions: honour fellows, consultant podiatric surgeons and surgical care practitioners. At that point many choose to stop prefixing their name with Dr and revert to the prefix they used before qualifying (or one they have since acquired.)

FRCS can be awarded without appearing for the fellowship examination based on the recommendation of the College Council. Such surgeons are usually surgeons of high calibre who have had distinguished achievements in their career. One such category is called Conferred Fellow. A fellow selected via this category will be entitled to use post-nominal FRCS(Glasg), and hence there will be no difference in terms of post-nominals between this category of FRCS and others.

Fellows
The original 300 Fellows of the Royal College of Surgeons of England (FRCS) include:
Marcus Beck (1843-1893)
 John Badley (1783–1870)
John Abernethy (1764–1831)
 Robert Keate (1777–1857)
 Richard Partridge (1805–1873)
 Joseph Jordan (1787-1873)

See :Category:Fellows of the Royal College of Surgeons for more recent examples of Fellows.

See also
 Fellow of the American College of Surgeons
 Fellowship in Dental Surgery FDSRCS England

References

Professional titles and certifications
Surgical organisations based in the United Kingdom